There are two species of skink named wedge-snouted skink:
 Chalcides sepsoides, species of skink found in Egypt, Israel, Jordan, Libya, and the Palestinian territories
 Trachylepis acutilabris, species of skink found in Namibia, Angola, Democratic Republic of the Congo, and South Africa